Jesper Agergård (born 18 February 1975) is a Danish cyclist. He competed in the 2000 Summer Olympics.

References

1975 births
Living people
Cyclists at the 2000 Summer Olympics
Danish male cyclists
Olympic cyclists of Denmark